Minas Conspiracy (Portuguese: Inconfidência Mineira) is a 1948 Brazilian historical film directed by Carmen Santos and starring Santos, Rodolfo Mayer and Roberto Lupo. The film portrays the 1789 Inconfidência Mineira, an unsuccessful attempt by some inhabitants of Minas Gerais to declare independence from Portugal. The film was produced by Brasil Vita Filmes, an independent studio controlled by Santos, who directed the film.

Partial cast
 Rodolfo Mayer as Tiradentes 
 Carmen Santos as Bárbara Heliodora
 Roberto Lupo   
 Oswaldo Loureiro    
 Augusto R. Chaves  
 Antonia Marzullo
 Paulo Porto

References

Bibliography
 Marsh, Leslie. Brazilian Women's Filmmaking: From Dictatorship to Democracy. University of Illinois Press, 2012.

External links

1940s historical drama films
1948 films
Brazilian historical drama films
Films set in 1789
Films set in Brazil
1940s Portuguese-language films
Brazilian black-and-white films
1948 drama films